Hammett is a 1982 American neo-noir mystery film directed by Wim Wenders and executive produced by Francis Ford Coppola. The screenplay was written by Ross Thomas and Dennis O'Flaherty, based on the novel of the same name by Joe Gores. It stars Frederic Forrest as detective story writer Dashiell Hammett, who gets caught up in a mystery very much like one of his own stories. Marilu Henner plays Hammett's neighbor, Kit Conger, and Peter Boyle plays Jimmy Ryan, an old friend from Hammett's days as a Pinkerton agent. The film was entered into the 1982 Cannes Film Festival.

Plot
San Francisco-based Dashiell Hammett, trying to put his Pinkerton detective days behind him while establishing himself as a writer, finds himself drawn back into his old life one last time by the irresistible call of friendship and to honor a debt. In 1928, Hammett, known to his librarian neighbor Kit and other acquaintances as "Sam" is holed up in a cheap apartment, hard at work at his typewriter each day. He drinks heavily, smokes too much and has coughing fits. One day, a friend and mentor from his Pinkerton days, Jimmy Ryan, turns up with a request, that Hammett help him track down a Chinese prostitute named Crystal Ling in the Chinatown district of San Francisco, an area Hammett is more familiar with than Ryan. Hammett is soon pulled into a multi-layered plot, losing the only copy of his manuscript, wondering how and why Ryan has vanished, being followed by a tough-talking gunsel, discovering a million-dollar blackmail scheme and being deceived by the diabolical Crystal, right up to a final confrontation near the San Francisco wharf.

Cast
 Frederic Forrest as Dashiell Hammett
 Peter Boyle as Jimmy Ryan
 Marilu Henner as Kit Conger / Sue Alabama
 Roy Kinnear as English Eddie Hagedorn
 Elisha Cook, Jr. as Eli the Taxi Driver
 Lydia Lei as Crystal Ling
 R. G. Armstrong as Lt. O'Mara
 Richard Bradford as Detective Bradford
 Michael Chow as Fong Wei Tau
 David Patrick Kelly as The Punk
 Sylvia Sidney as Donaldina Cameron
 Jack Nance as Gary Salt
 Elmer Kline as Doc Fallon
 Royal Dano as Pops
 Samuel Fuller as Old Man in Pool Hall
 Fox Harris as Frank the News Vendor

Production
Critically acclaimed German director Wim Wenders was hired by Francis Ford Coppola to direct Hammett as his American debut feature. Coppola and the film's financing studio, Orion, were dissatisfied with the original version and nearly the entire film was reshot. This led to allegations that most of it was directed by Coppola: The A.V. Club review of the 2005 DVD even claimed "only 30 percent of Wenders' footage remained, and the rest was completely reshot by Coppola, whose mere "executive producer" credit is just a technicality"; the reviewer does not give any sources (noting "A Coppola or Wenders commentary track might have sorted things out a bit — or at least settled an old score — but the bare-bones DVD release leaves viewers with a fascinating mess"), but argues "The finished product is clearly more Coppola than Wenders, since its period soundstage aesthetic so closely resembles One from the Heart, The Cotton Club, and other '80s Coppola productions."  Another 2011 review mentions "rumours that Coppola was unhappy with Wenders’ directorial efforts and thus re-shot and re-edited much of the film himself, although Wenders denies this. It would certainly explain some of the film's oddities."

Wenders made a 17-minute "diary film" Reverse Angle (1982), which deals among others with "the editing process of HAMMETT in the presence of Francis Ford Coppola". In a 2015 interview, Wenders with "no traces of bitterness" stated unambiguously that he directed the reshoot (although Coppola tended to micro-manage his productions direction-wise): "there wasn’t much money left, and I was too stubborn to drop it and or say, “Well then let somebody else do it.” Francis [Ford Coppola] was too stubborn to fire me so we stuck it out and we respected each other in spite of all the conflict." The reshoot was "entirely in one sound stage", which Wenders avoids: "The first film was shot entirely on location […] in real places in San Francisco." Of that, "In the final product ten shots survived from my original shoot: only exteriors […] a couple of shots from the first, maybe 5% of the film from the first version." When Wenders later wanted to finish and release his director's cut as "an interesting case study", he found the material was destroyed: "They only kept a cut negative, everything else is junked."

Casting
Boyle took over the role of Jimmy Ryan from Brian Keith, who left allegedly because the lengthy production conflicted with other commitments. Keith can be seen in some long shots in the film. A number of actors from the "Golden Age" of Hollywood were cast in the film, including Sylvia Sidney, Hank Worden, Royal Dano and Elisha Cook, Jr. (who played Wilmer "the gunsel" in John Huston's 1941 film The Maltese Falcon).

References

External links
 
 
 

1982 films
1980s English-language films
American Zoetrope films
American biographical films
Films directed by Wim Wenders
American mystery films
American detective films
American neo-noir films
Orion Pictures films
Warner Bros. films
Films scored by John Barry (composer)
Films about writers
Dashiell Hammett
1980s American films